Rosa Kutty (born 1964)  is a former Indian woman athlete who participated in 1996 and 2000 Olympics in 4x 400 relay race. She won silver medal in 1998 Asian Games in 800 mt race. She is from Aayavana, Muvattupuzha in Kerala and now live in Bangalore in Karnataka. She works as Sports Officer in the Bangalore Division of South Western Railways
She got Arjuna award for her achievements in 1994.

Medals
Silver medal in 800m at Asian Meet, Delhi, 1989 
Bronze in 800m at Beijing Asiad 
Silver at Bangkok Asiad, 1998

References

1964 births
Living people
Indian female middle-distance runners
20th-century Indian women
20th-century Indian people
People from Muvattupuzha
Olympic athletes of India
Recipients of the Arjuna Award
Sportswomen from Kerala
Athletes (track and field) at the 1996 Summer Olympics
Athletes (track and field) at the 2000 Summer Olympics
Asian Games medalists in athletics (track and field)
Athletes (track and field) at the 1990 Asian Games
Athletes (track and field) at the 1998 Asian Games
Athletes from Bangalore
Asian Games silver medalists for India
Asian Games bronze medalists for India
Medalists at the 1990 Asian Games
Medalists at the 1998 Asian Games